Pleospora is a genus of ascomycete fungi. This genus was originally described by Gottlob Ludwig Rabenhorst in 1857 and was revised by Wehmeyer and Müller. There are an estimated 63 species.

Selected species 

 Pleospora alfalfae
 Pleospora allii, Stemphylium leaf blight
 Pleospora ambigua
 Pleospora bardanae Niessl 1876 
 Pleospora betae
 Pleospora bjoerlingii
 Pleospora eturmiuna
 Pleospora gaudefroyi, Patouillard, now in genus Decorospora
 Pleospora gigaspora
 Pleospora gracilariae
 Pleospora halophila
 Pleospora herbarum
 Pleospora iqbalii
 Pleospora lamnaria
 Pleospora leptosphaerulinoides
 Pleospora lycopersici
 Pleospora mullerii
 Pleospora paludiscirpi
 Pleospora papaveracea, possible biocontrol for oriental poppy, now in genus Crivellia. 
 Pleospora pelagica
 Pleospora pelvetiae
 Pleospora rubicunda
 Pleospora rudis
 Pleospora sedicola
 Pleospora shepherdiae, attacks dead twigs of Crataegus
 Pleospora spartinae
 Pleospora tarda
 Pleospora theae
 Pleospora tomatonis
 Pleospora triglochinicola
 Pleospora welwitschiae

References

  S.T. Tilak Two new species of Pleospora from India  
  Spp

External links

  Photo: Asci of Pleospora herbarum

Pleosporaceae
Dothideomycetes genera